Raheenduff is a small hamlet situated between Oulart, Ballyedmond and Boolavogue in County Wexford, Ireland. It is in the Civil parish of Kilcormick, in the Barony of Ballaghkeen North and comprises 160.73 hectares.

In the 1901 census 31 inhabitants are recorded and in 1911 this has increased to 39.

References

Towns and villages in County Wexford